MF Mary is a Danish ferry sailing on the crossing over Hvalpsund between Hvalpsund-Sundsøre. It was built in 2006. The ferry can include up to 147 passengers and 30 passenger cars. The new ferry Mary, of the Sleipner-Fur type, was put into operation in March 2006. Motor and ferry service started in 1927 with the ferry MF Hvalpsund, this was the only rail ferry owned by a private railway company, which sailed to 1980. In 1980 a new ferry was introduced on the route, Hvalpsund 2, which had previously sailed for the Motorfolk's ferry crossing Sallingsund, between Pinen, Salling and Plagen, Mors.

References

2006 ships
Ships built in Denmark
Ferries of Denmark